Khenejin Rural District is a rural district (dehestan) in the Central District of Komijan County, Markazi Province, Iran. At the 2006 census, its population was 10,317, in 2,611 families. The rural district has 19 villages.

References 

Rural Districts of Markazi Province
Komijan County